Ludovic Lefebvre (born 18 April 1971) is a Michelin-star French chef, restaurateur, author, and television personality. He trained in France for 12 years before moving to Los Angeles.  He was awarded the prestigious Forbes Travel Guide Five Star Award at two different restaurants, L'Orangerie in 1999 and 2000 and Bastide in 2006. He then went on to create LudoBites, a multi-city restaurant tour, followed by opening two restaurants in Los Angeles, Trois Mec and Petit Trois. LA Weekly named Trois Mec Best New Restaurant Los Angeles in 2013, Los Angeles' Best Restaurant in 2014 and 2016, and Ludo Best Chef in 2015.

Early life and training
Lefebvre was born in Auxerre, Burgundy and grew up in a small village called Charbuy. In his early teens, he expressed his desire to be a chef. His father took him to a local restaurant named Maxime and asked them to give Lefebvre some menial job to discourage him, but contrary to his father's intentions, he loved it. His love for food began in childhood, spending many days in his grandmother's kitchen.

His formal culinary training began at age 14 at the restaurant L’Esperance in Vézelay under chef Marc Meneau, where he worked for three years. He then worked with Pierre Gagnaire at his eponymous restaurant in Saint-Étienne (now closed), then with  Alain Passard at L'Arpège, where he trained in what he describes as "the school of fire," learning to control and play with heat. Ludo concluded his formal French training with Guy Martin at Le Grand Vefour, from whom he states that he learned the business side of the food service industry.

Career

Restaurants
In 1996, Lefebvre moved to Los Angeles where he began work at L'Orangerie at the invitation of Gilles Epie, who was the head chef at the time.  About a year later, at the age of 25, he was promoted to executive chef and went on to see the restaurant become one of the top-rated in California, receiving the  Mobil Guide five-star award.

In 2004, he moved to the restaurant Bastide on Melrose Place, which was also awarded the prestigious Mobil Guide five-star award under his direction. The dishes he created there included panini au foie gras with an apricot based accompaniment, poularde marinated in Pepsi-Cola with popcorn, and panna cotta topped with caviar in a salted-butter caramel sauce. After the restaurant closed for renovations, he decided not to return. Ludo asked his friend who owned Breadbar, Ali Chalabi, if he could take over the bakery at night for 3 months when it was otherwise closed. There he created a special event dining experience which ultimately became known as LudoBites and was deemed by LA Weeklys Pulitzer Prize-winning critic, Jonathan Gold, as "a transforming moment in the Los Angeles restaurant scene."

He created the opening menu for the restaurant Lavo at the Palazzo in Las Vegas, and returned to Los Angeles in 2009. In May of that year, Ludo revived his special event dining concept LudoBites at Breadbar for another 3 months which ran for two years.  He went on to do nine total LudoBites pop-ups in Los Angeles, and one in Hawaii, crashing OpenTable twice and booking 6 weeks of reservations in 47 seconds.

Bon Appetit called Ludo "the king of pop-ups." Food writer Richard Guzman wrote of his experience at this venue: "I was sad. The meal was over. In a way, eating at Ludobites is like hooking up with someone way out of your league while on vacation with none of your friends around to witness it and no chance of replicating the experience." The restaurant achieved national acclaim when New York Times restaurant critic Sam Sifton summarized his experience in an article on August 3, 2010: "The first night eating all this was an amazement. The second was about ten times better – each dish perfectly executed, with every flavor in place, every temperature correct, every plate a fully realized piece of art. It was only the fifth night the restaurant had been open."

In September 2010, Ludo brought fried chicken to the streets of Los Angeles by opening his food truck, known on the streets as LudoTruc. In October 2013, Ludo took his fried chicken concept to the next level opening his first brick and mortar location, LudoBird, inside the STAPLES Center. In March 2016, the second location of LudoBird opened at City Walk, Universal Studios Hollywood.

Ludo is credited with carrying the flag for Los Angeles modern fine dining.  In April 2013 he opened Trois Mec in partnership with friends Jon Shook and Vinny Dotolo. Trois Mec has earned 4 star reviews from both Los Angeles Magazine and LA Weekly, and was named Best New Restaurant by both publications.  It was named Esquire Magazine's Best New Restaurant List for 2013, also included in GOOP – List of Best Tasting Menus in the World under $100 and made Zagat's list of Top 10 Hottest Restaurants in the World for 2013. Food & Wine Magazine awarded Trois Mec with the #1 Best Restaurant Dish of 2013 and GQ placed Trois Mec #2 on its list of Best New Restaurants in the country for 2014. LA Weekly  named it the #1 Best Restaurant in Los Angeles for both 2014 and 2015. Trois Mec has also been listed as #34 on the Top 100 U.S. Restaurant List for 2015 on the popular blog Opinionated About Dining.

In July 2014, Ludo opened his second restaurant, Petit Trois, his "bar-a-la-carte" concept. Eater LA called it "the most hotly anticipated restaurant opening in 2014." Petit Trois is located next door to its sister restaurant, Trois Mec. It was awarded four stars by LA Weekly food critic Besha Rodell, who said, "It is simultaneously one of the most modest and ambitious restaurants to open in recent memory. It's a love letter to another city, written in food, by one of our greatest culinary poets." 'Jonathan Gold, who had by then moved from LA Weekly to the Los Angeles Times, wrote that "there may be no better plate of escargot in town than at the new Petit Trois." Lesley Balla for Angeleno Magazine called it "Petit Perfection", saying "this is a neighborhood bistro for true artistes, after all, created by culinary rockstars. And, unsurprisingly, it is a smash hit." Petit Trois was a 2015 James Beard finalist for Best New Restaurant.

Television appearances
In 2006, Ludo appeared on Iron Chef America, challenging Mario Batali  in a battle of Big Eye Tuna, where Batali prevailed. Beginning in 2009, Lefebvre appeared on the first and second seasons of Top Chef Masters. He was a guest judge on season 8 of Hell's Kitchen in 2010, and season 20 in 2020. In 2011 alongside his wife, Krissy, he starred in a seven-episode series entitled Ludo Bites America on the Sundance Channel. He also appeared in a 2007 episode of The Apprentice, on which his wife was competing at the time.

In January 2013, Ludo joined Anthony Bourdain and Nigella Lawson as a judge/mentor on the ABC prime time cook competition show called The Taste, and was named the "break-out star" of the show by the New York Times. Returning for seasons two and three alongside Bourdain, Lawson, and Marcus Samuelsson, Ludo was pronounced the winning mentor of the hit competition series in season two. In addition, Ludo starred alongside Bourdain and Lawson in the UK version of the show in 2014, where "Team Ludo" took home the trophy and he was declared the winning mentor.

Other TV appearances include: The Today Show, Access Hollywood, Extra!, CNN Money, The Talk, Carson Daly, NPR Morning Edition, The Rachael Ray Show, Good Morning America, Andrew Zimmern's Bizarre Eats and a very special episode of No Reservations in his home town in Burgundy.

In 2016 he was featured as the host chef on Season 5 of Mind of a Chef. Full episodes can be found on The Mind of a Chef website full episodes 

Ludo also shares his love of home cooked meals by creating the web-only series, Ludo à la Maison.

In 2020, Ludo appeared on Selena Gomez's cooking series, "Selena + Chef".

In 2022, Ludo began co-hosting the TBS cooking competition, Rat in the Kitchen.

Book
In 2005, Lefebvre released his first book, Crave: The Feast of the Five Senses. It categorizes recipes by sense: "See", "Touch", "Smell", "Hear", and "Taste". The book won second place in the cookbook category in the New York Book Show.

In 2012, LudoBites: Recipes and Stories from the Pop-Up Restaurants of Ludo Lefebvre was released. LudoBites is a chronicle and a cookbook, containing tales of the career of this "rock star" of the culinary world and the full story of his innovation the "pop-up" or "touring" restaurant that moves from place to place.

In 2015, Lefebvre released a special 10th Anniversary Edition of his first cookbook, Crave: The Feast of the Five Senses, with new photography, a new cover shot by Lionel Deluy and a crowd-sourced cover art campaign in conjunction with Talent House. Hundred of submissions poured in from across the globe, and ultimately the cover design was awarded to Charles Stanley Doll IV.

Awards
Rising in prominence in the culinary world, Ludo was a finalist for the James Beard Foundation "Rising Chef Award" in 2001, and was named by Relais & Châteaux as one of the World's 50 Greatest Chefs. His restaurant Petit Trois was a 2015 James Beard finalist for Best New Restaurant. In 2017, Ludo was finalist for James Beard Best Chef West Award, as well as for Best Culinary Program for his performance on The Mind of a Chef.

In the summer of 2017, Ludo made a cameo appearance in the Apple Movie, The Rock x Siri "Dominate the Day" alongside Dwayne "The Rock" Johnson.

Cooking at home is very important to Ludo and he has created an at-home video series, entitled "Ludo à la Maison" demonstrating home recipes with stories from his life in France and professional kitchens. Episodes are shot in his home kitchen and distributed through www.foodandwine.com. Dishes include Moules la creme; Chocolate Mousse; Sole Meuniere; Lamb Chops; Ratatouille; Parisian Gnocchi; Floating Island; and Steak Frites. Episodes are released twice a year. As of Summer 2017, 28 episodes have been produced. Ludo's wife and business partner, Krissy, produces the videos in partnership with Big Tex Entertainment, Director Jeff Ross.

Other Media Appearances 
In October 2018, Lefebvre appeared on the YouTube show Feast Mansion on the channel First we Feast with Joji and Rich Brian.

In August 2019, Lefebvre made another appearance on the YouTube show Feast Mansion on the channel First we Feast.

Lefebvre was the guest chef in the first episode of Selena + Chef, Selena Gomez's cooking show on HBO Max.

Food style
Lefebvre has described his food as "French with an international flavour." Some of Ludo's best-known dishes include a rack of lamb in a caraway-seasoned broth with baby vegetables, entrecôte with vanilla-flavoured potato purée, and cardamom and pericarp pepper encrusted lamb. He has been known for using over 200 spices and believes that his most unusual "truc" (technique) is making crême chantilly with fats other than cream, which he learned from Pierre Gagnaire, and his favorite cookbook is La Pyramide Cookbook by Fernand Point.

Personal life
Lefebvre resides in Sherman Oaks, California, with his wife Kristine and their twins, Luca and Rêve.

Decorations 
 Chevalier of the Order of Arts and Letters (2015)

References

External links
 

1971 births
Living people
People from Auxerre
French cookbook writers
French chefs
French expatriates in the United States
French restaurateurs
Participants in American reality television series
People from Manhattan Beach, California
Chevaliers of the Ordre des Arts et des Lettres
Chefs from Los Angeles